The cuisine of Rwanda is based on local staple foods produced by the traditional subsistence-level agriculture and has historically varied across different areas.

Background
Rwandan staples include bananas, plantains, pulses, sweet potatoes, beans, and cassava (manioc). Historically this is particularly true of the Twa and the Hutus who hunted and farmed. Their diet was high in vegetables and lacking in animal protein due to the small amount of animal products consumed. The Tutsis were traditionally pastoralists and consumed a higher amount of milk and dairy products.

Many Rwandans eat a lot of meat nowadays. For those that live near lakes and have access to fish, tilapia is popular. The potato, thought to have been introduced to Rwanda by German and Belgian colonists, is now very popular and is cultivated in the towns of Gitarama and Butare.

National dishes

Various dishes have evolved from the range of basic foods consumed. Ugali (or bugali), eaten throughout sub-Saharan Africa, is a paste made from maize and water to form a porridge-like consistency. Isombe is made from mashed cassava leaves and served with meat or fish.

Matoke is a dish made from baked or steamed bananas. Ibihaza is made from pumpkins cut into pieces, mixed with beans and boiled without peeling them. The groundnut paste ikinyiga and millet flour paste umutsima w’uburo are made from boiling water and flour, mixed to a porridge-like consistency. In the restaurants in the capital city of Kigali, locals and expatriates eat a variety of international cuisine, including Indian, Chinese, Italian, and African. In other cities and towns, the cuisine is simpler, often consisting of chicken, fish, goat or steak served with rice or French fries.

Beverages
Milk is a common drink among Rwandans. Other popular drinks in Rwanda include fruit juice, wine, beer and soda (Fanta) for those who do not drink alcohol. Commercial beers drunk in Rwanda include Primus, Mützig and Amstel. In rural areas, urwagwa is a beer made from the fermented juice of bananas that has been mixed with roasted sorghum flour.

Beers feature in traditional rituals and ceremonies and are generally consumed only by men. Ikigage is an alcoholic beverage made from dry sorghum that is thought to have medicinal powers. Ubuki is made from fermented honey and has an alcohol content of about 12 percent.

See also
 Ugandan cuisine

References

Bibliography 

 
East African cuisine